Air Heritage is an air charter company in India owned by Heritage Aviation.

Destinations

Gauchar

Fleet
As of March 2020, Air Heritage possesses the following aircraft:

Accidents and incidents
9 February 2019: A Pithoragarh Airport-bound nine-seater aircraft's door opened midair.

References

External links
Ticket booking website

Airlines of India
Airlines established in 2019
Companies based in Uttarakhand
2019 establishments in Delhi
Indian companies established in 2019